Piper Race Cars is an American racecar constructor. The company was founded by Don Sievenpiper in 1991.

History

Piper Race Cars was founded in 1991 by Don Sievenpiper. He designed the Piper DF2 to race in Formula Ford 1600 in 1992. The DF2 was followed by the DF3 in 1998. The Piper DF3 won the SCCA National Championship Runoffs in the Formula Ford class in 2010 and 2012 with Tim Kautz. In 2002 the DF3 was replaced by the DF5. Tim Kautz won 2 races in the F1600 Championship Series in Piper DF5 which placed him second in the championship. The Piper DF5 won the Runoffs in 2002 and 2003 in the Formula Ford class with Justin Pritchard. The runoffs were almost won again in 2004, but a bolt in the brakes came undone and the car went flying off the track. After that a Formula 2000 variation was made. In 2007 and 2008 Justin Pritchard won the AARC F1000 race at Road Atlanta, and was winning at another race in 2008 until an engine blow took him out of contention. Don Sievenpiper sold the company in 2007 to Fast Forward Components. In 2011 a Piper DF5 driven by Brian Novak won the SCCA National Championship Runoffs in the Formula 1000 class.  Piper Race Cars is currently owed by Doug Learned and is located in Sand City CA.

Race cars

External links

 Piper Race Cars

American racecar constructors
Automotive motorsports and performance companies
Companies based in Monterey County, California
1991 establishments in California
American companies established in 1991